Quercus oblongifolia, commonly known as the Mexican blue oak, Arizona blue oak, Blue live oak or Sonoran blue oak, is an evergreen small tree or large shrub in the white oak group.

Distribution
Quercus oblongifolia grows in high grasslands, canyons and mesas in southwestern United States (Texas, Arizona and New Mexico) and northwestern Mexico (Baja California Sur, Chihuahua, Coahuila, Sinaloa and Sonora states). Mexican blue oak is closely related to Engelman oak "Quercus engelmannii" in Southern California. The two species may be conspecific and could be combined as one species.

Description
The Mexican blue oak is a small evergreen tree growing 5–8 metres (16–27 feet) tall with a rounded crown. At higher elevations it is typically a large shrub. The twigs are yellowish brown and hairless with reddish brown buds. The leaves are small, alternate and oblong, with entire margins, leathery, bluish-green above and mid green below. The flowers appear in spring at the same time as the old leaves are being shed and new leaf growth starts. The male flowers form yellowish-green catkins and the female flowers are solitary or paired and grow in the leaf axils.

Habitat
The Mexican blue oak is common at elevations of 1,200 to 1,800 m (4,000–6,000 ft). It is often found on thin sandy soils in semi-arid regions and is the dominant species in lower open oak woodland where it grows in association with Arizona white oak (Quercus arizonica) and Emory oak (Quercus emoryi). It is an important constituent of pinyon–juniper communities. where it grows in association with species of pine and juniper, Arizona rosewood (Vauquelinia californica), shrubby buckwheat (Eriogonum wrightii), catclaw mimosa (Mimosa aculeaticarpa), bullgrass (Muhlenbergia emersleyi), plains lovegrass (Eragrostis intermedia), fendlerbush (Fendlera rupicola) and wolftail (Lycurus phleoides).

Cultivation

Mexican blue oak "Quercus oblongifolia" popularity in landscaping has been increasing in California with many plantings at Apple Park and other Bay area plantings. The fast growth and beautiful blue foliage makes selections from trees in Arizona the best for cultivation.

References

oblongifolia
Trees of the Southwestern United States
Plants described in 1853
Oaks of Mexico
Flora of the Sierra Madre Occidental